Frankfurter Handball Club is a German women's handball from Frankfurt (Oder).

History
During the communist era Frankfurter HC was the handball section of military sports club ASK Vorwärts, installed in Frankfurt since 1971. Vorwärts was one of the most successful East German team in the 1980s, winning six national championships between 1982 and 1990. It was also successful in international competitions, winning two EHF Cups in 1985 and 1990.

Following the reunification of Germany the ASK Vorwärts society was disbanded in 1991, and Frankfurt became an independent club and joined the Handball-Bundesliga as BFV Frankfurt. In 1994 the club merged with local team and took its current name.

While the club's status has decreased following the reunification Frankfurter has still been fairly successful since, winning the 1997 EHF City Cup, the 2003 national cup and the 2004 championship. Most recently it was sixth in 2011, qualifying for the EHF Cup.

Titles
 EHF Cup
 1985, 1990
 Challenge Cup
 1997
 DDR-Oberliga
 1982, 1983, 1985, 1986, 1987, 1990
 DDR-Pokal
 1981, 1982, 1984, 1986, 1990
 Bundesliga
 2004
 DHB-Pokal
 2003

References

Sport in Frankfurt (Oder)
Military sports clubs
German handball clubs